Ralph O'Donnell (17 October 1931 – May 2011) was an English professional footballer who played as a wing half.

Career
Born in Cudworth, O'Donnell made 183 appearances for Sheffield Wednesday, 170 of them in the Football League. He also played non-League football for Upton Colliery and Buxton.

He died in May 2011 at the age of 79.

References

1931 births
2011 deaths
English footballers
Upton Colliery F.C. players
Sheffield Wednesday F.C. players
Buxton F.C. players
English Football League players
Association football midfielders